FK Čaňa is a Slovak football team, based in the village of Čaňa.

Cup history
They reached the second round of the 2000–01 Slovak Cup before losing 1-4 to eventual runners-up SCP Ružomberok, and the quarter-finals the following year, again losing to the eventual runners-up, Matador Púchov, by a score of 1-5.  This success qualified them for the first round in 2002–03 but they were knocked out straight away. They also reached the first round in 2004.

Naming history
1923 – ŠK Čaňa (Športový klub Čaňa)
1963 – TJ Družstevník Čaňa (Telovýchovná jednota Družstevník Čaňa)
1996 – FK Hydina Čaňa (Futbalový klub Hydina Čana)
2004 – FK Čaňa (Futbalový klub Čaňa)

References

External links
Ligy.sk profile 
  
Club profile at Futbalnet.sk 

Football clubs in Slovakia